Jan Ernestovich Sten (Russian: Ян Эрнестович Стэн; Latvian: Jānis Stens; 21 March 189920 June 1937) was a Soviet Communist Party functionary and specialist in Marxist philosophy.

Early career 
Born into a peasant family in modern-day Latvia, Jan Sten joined the Bolsheviks as a teenager, in 1914, shortly before taking up a place at a teachers' seminary in Valmiera. In 1917, when Latvia was overrun by the German army, he was evacuated to Syzran After graduating, in 1919, he fought in the Russian Civil War. In 1921, he was one of the original batch of students enrolled in the Institute of Red Professors, and graduated from its philosophy department in 1924, after which he taught at Moscow State University and served on the editorial board of the magazine Under the Banner of Marxism. From 1924 to 1927, he was head of the propaganda department of Comintern. He was a member of the Central Control Commission of the Communist Party of the Soviet Union; from 1927 to 1928, he was deputy head of the propaganda department of the Communist Party of the Soviet Union. From 1928 to 1930, he was deputy director of the Marx-Engels Institute.

Stalin's tutor 
According to Yeveny Frolov, an Old Bolshevik who survived the purges:

Opposition and execution 
It can be assumed that Jan Sten privately sided with Nikolai Bukharin in his opposition to the campaign to force the Soviet Union's rural population onto collective farms. Although he did not express his opposition openly, he was dismissed from his posts in 1930. He then joined the conspiratorial group led by Martemyan Ryutin who plotted to remove Stalin from office, and was openly calling for "the liquidation of Stalin and his clique". He was also a member of a secret oppositional group which included Sergey Syrtsov and Vissaron Lominadze, this group later joined a larger oppositional bloc which was dissolved in early 1933.  He was arrested in October 1932, held for two months in Butyrka prison, then deported to Akmolinsk, in Kazakhstan. He was permitted to return to Moscow in 1934, after making an admission of error, and was employed on the Great Soviet Encyclopedia. He was re-arrested on 3 August 1936, and during the first of the Moscow Show Trials on 20 August, the lead defendant, Grigory Zinoviev named him as one of the conspirators who had been plotting against Stalin. He was shot on 20 June 1937.

Personality 
Bukharin's widow, Anna Larina, described Sten as "an independent-minded party man who always looked down on Stalin from a position of superior intellect" adding "There was something majestic in the proud bearing of this Latvian with his expressive, intelligent face, Socratic brow, and shock of white hair."

Jan Sten was posthumously rehabilitated in August 1988.

References 

1899 births
1937 deaths
People from the Governorate of Livonia
Latvian Marxists
Soviet Marxists
Old Bolsheviks
Latvian revolutionaries
Great Purge victims from Latvia
Institute of Red Professors alumni
Comintern people